Șoarș (Transylvanian Saxon dialect: Schursch) is a commune in Brașov County, Transylvania, Romania. It is composed of five villages: Bărcuț, Felmer, Rodbav, Seliștat, and Șoarș. Each village has a fortified church.

Geography
The commune lies within the southern reaches of the Transylvanian Plateau. The river Hârtibaciu flows through the village of Bărcuț; its left tributary, Valea Morii, flows through the village of Seliștat.

History
In October 1916, Șoarș was the site of the Battle of Báránykút, where a German offensive was successfully repulsed by the Romanian Second Army during the Battle of Transylvania in World War I.

Economy
The Rodbav gas field is situated on the territory of the commune. It was discovered in 1935 and began production in 1938.

Natives
  (1899–1966), folklorist.

References

Communes in Brașov County
Localities in Transylvania